Ain al Yaqeen (Heart of the Matter in English) is an Arabic news magazine published weekly, focusing on political topics.

Profile
Ain al Yaqeen has also an English edition. It is published online. The magazine is seen as a government publication or as a semi-official weekly political magazine.

Contents
After it was revealed that a member of the royal family had indirectly funded one of the hijackers in the September 11 attacks, Prince Nayef in an article published in the English edition of the weekly on 29 November 2002 claimed that the Jews were behind the attacks.

See also
List of magazines in Saudi Arabia

References

Magazines published in Saudi Arabia
Arabic-language magazines
English-language magazines
Saudi Arabian news websites
English-language websites
Arabic-language websites
Weekly magazines
Online magazines
News magazines published in Asia